Alinaghi Alikhani (‎; 21 January 1929 – 25 June 2019) was an Iranian economist who held government posts in the 1960s and was the first minister of economy. He also served as the Chancellor of Tehran University.

Early life and education
Alikhani was born in Khamseh, near Abhar, Zanjan Province, on 21 January 1929. His father, Abedin Khan, was a Kazakh petty officer.  Later he began to serve as the administrator of the lands in Khamseh and nearby regions owned by Reza Shah. The family moved to a village, Varamin, near Tehran where Alikhani was raised.

Alikhani graduated from Tehran University with a bachelor's degree in law in 1949. During his studies at the university he was part of an anti-communism group. He got a doctor of business administration in France. He also received a PhD degree in economics from Paris University. His thesis focused on the potential role of states in encouraging industrialisation. While attending Paris University the Savak officials proposed him to join the organization which Alikhani accepted.

Career

Alikhani returned to Iran in 1957 and started his career at the economic analysis department of Savak. Next he worked at the National Oil Company and became a consultant to the Tehran Trade Chamber. Alikhani was made the minister of industry and commerce in 1963. Next he was named the minister of economy on 19 February 1963 when the ministry was first established. In fact, Alikhani was asked to involve in the establishment of the ministry of economy transforming the ministry of industry and commerce. The cabinet was headed by Prime Minister Asadollah Alam, and Jahangir Tafazzoli recommended him to appoint Alikhani to the post.

Like other senior officials of the period Alikhani  was a supporter of the protectionism and the promotion of the private sector. Alikhani served in the same post in the next cabinets led by two different prime ministers, Hassan Ali Mansour and Amir Abbas Hoveida. When he was minister of economy Alikhani informed the Shah, Mohammed Reza Pahlavi, about his half-brother Gholam Reza Pahlavi's illegal financial activities with the officials from an East European country. He was in office until 19 July 1969 when he resigned from the post. His successor as minister of economy was Hushang Ansary. The reason for his resignation was the clash between the Shah and Alikhani due to the Shah's inclination to intervene in the economy and the regulation of prices.

Alikhani's next post was the Chancellor of Tehran University to which he was appointed in 1969. He held the post until 1971. After his retirement from governmental roles Alikhani involved in business. He also served as a board member of the royal organization of social welfare headed by Ashraf Pahlavi.

Books
Alikhani was the author of several books, including The Shah and I: The Confidential Diary of Iran's Royal Court, 1968-77 and Alam Diaries.

Personal life and death
Alikhani met his future wife, a French women, in France during his graduate studies. They had four children, three sons and a daughter.

They were forced to leave Iran just after the establishment of the Islamic Republic in 1979. Alikhani and his wife settled in Washington DC. He died in June 2019.

References

External links

20th-century Iranian businesspeople
20th-century Iranian economists
20th-century Iranian writers
21st-century Iranian writers
1929 births
2019 deaths
Economy ministers
Exiles of the Iranian Revolution in the United States
Government ministers of Iran
Chancellors of the University of Tehran
Iranian anti-communists
People of SAVAK
University of Paris alumni
University of Tehran alumni